Fabricamos su Sudadera Ltda is a sports apparel manufacturer founded in 1987 in Bogotá, Colombia.

FSS have manufactured, with the proper approval and permits, uniforms for some of the most famous international brands like: Adidas, Topper, Fila, Puma, Patrick, and Reebok.

Have a production plant involved in every step of the creation process: cut, stamping, confection.

FSS, make and distribute sporting goods. The creation of uniforms for different schools and corporate sports leagues is your main production source.

FSS produces about 15 000 articles per year.

Sponsorship
FSS has sponsored several teams of Colombian professional soccer from Categoría Primera A and Categoría Primera B, some participants in the Copa Libertadores and in the 2004 Intercontinental Cup.

Some teams:
 Real Cartagena
 Unión Magdalena
 Atlético Juventud

Affiliates 
Over the years 2008 and 2009 FSS had two subsidiaries brands on account of its sponsorship to América de Cali.

América Sport Wear (ASW) 

América Sport Wear (ASW) was a sportswear brand owned by América de Cali, this brand was created in 2008 because the sponsorship deal with sports brand FSS it had at the time for your clothes was affected because América de Cali was on the Clinton law list.
 
However FSS continued to design and manufacture of ASW.

ASW was short-lived, only use in 2008 when América de Cali was crowned champion of the 2008 Categoría Primera A season.

Nuevo América Sport (NAS) 

Nuevo América Sport (NAS) was a sportswear brand owned by New América de Cali, this brand was born in 2009 in conjunction with the process of democratization of América de Cali and to continue the same management that had been given in 2008 to the sponsorship of the sports brand FSS responsible for the design and manufacture of NAS.

NAS was used only in the year 2009.

External links 
 Web Site

References 

Sportswear brands
Companies based in Bogotá
Clothing companies established in 1987
Clothing brands of Colombia
Sporting goods manufacturers of Colombia